Kunthunath was the seventeenth Tirthankara, sixth Chakravartin and twelfth Kamadeva of the present half time cycle, Avasarpini. According to Jain beliefs, he became a siddha, liberated soul which has destroyed all of its karma. Kunthunatha was born to King Surya (Sura) and Queen Shridevi at Hastinapur in the Ikshvaku dynasty on the fourteenth day of the Vaishakh Krishna month of the Indian calendar.

Etymology
Kunthu means heap of Jewels.

Life
According to the Jain belief, he was born in 27,695,000 BC, Like all other Chakravartin, he also conquered all the lands and went to write his name on the foothills of mountains. Seeing the names of other Chakravartin already there, he saw his ambitions dwarfed. He then renounced his throne and became an ascetic for penance. At an age of 95,000 years he liberated his soul and attained Moksha on Mount Shikharji.

Famous Temple
Prachin Bada Mandir, Hastinapur, Uttar Pradesh
 Ganigitti Jain temple, Hampi
Kunthunath Temple at Jaisalmer Fort in Jaisalmer, Rajasthan

See also

God in Jainism
Arihant (Jainism)
Jainism and non-creationism

References

Sources

External links

Tirthankaras